Following the assassination of Prime Minister Dr. Hendrik Verwoerd in parliament on 6 September 1966, Adv. B.J. Vorster became the next Prime Minister of South Africa. He appointed members of the National Party to the following positions in his first Cabinet:

Cabinet 

Government of South Africa
Executive branch of the government of South Africa
Cabinets of South Africa
1966 establishments in South Africa
1970 disestablishments in South Africa
Cabinets established in 1966
Cabinets disestablished in 1970